Coenzyme F420-0:L-glutamate ligase (CofE-AF, MJ0768, CofE) is an enzyme with systematic name L-glutamate:coenzyme F420-0 ligase (GDP-forming). This enzyme catalyses the following chemical reaction

 GTP + coenzyme F420-0 + L-glutamate  GDP + phosphate + coenzyme F420-1

This protein catalyses the successive addition of two glutamate residues to cofactor F420 by two distinct and independent reactions.

References

External links 
 

EC 6.3.2